The Province of Brandenburg was a province of Prussia from 1815 to 1945. Brandenburg was established in 1815 from the Kingdom of Prussia's core territory, comprised the bulk of the historic Margraviate of Brandenburg (excluding Altmark) and the Lower Lusatia region, and became part of the German Empire in 1871. From 1918, Brandenburg was a province of the Free State of Prussia until it was dissolved in 1945 after World War II, and replaced with reduced territory as the State of Brandenburg in East Germany, which was later dissolved in 1952. Following the reunification of Germany in 1990, Brandenburg was re-established as a federal state of Germany, becoming one of the new states.

Brandenburg's provincial capital alternated between Potsdam, Berlin, and Charlottenburg during its existence.

Geography 
The province comprised large parts of the North German Plain, stretching from the Elbe river in the west to beyond the Oder in the east, where the Neumark region bordered on the Prussian Grand Duchy of Posen (Province of Posen from 1848). Other neighbouring provinces were Pomerania in the northeast, Silesia in the southeast, and Prussian Saxony in the southwest. Brandenburg also shared a common border with the grand duchies of Mecklenburg-Schwerin and Mecklenburg-Strelitz in the northwest as well as with Anhalt in the west.

Beside the Elbe and Oder river areas, the province covered large parts of the Spree and Havel basin. The largest cities were Berlin, located in the centre together with the growing suburbs of Spandau, Charlottenburg, Schöneberg and Neukölln. Larger towns were the royal residence Potsdam and the regional capital Frankfurt (Oder), furthermore Landsberg (present-day Gorzów Wielkopolski) in the east, the historic capital Brandenburg an der Havel as well as Cottbus, Forst and Guben (Gubin) in Lower Lusatia.

History 
The first people who are known to have inhabited Brandenburg were the Germanic Suebi. During the Migration Period, they were succeeded by the Polabian Slavs, whose fortress at Brandenburg an der Havel was conquered by the German king Henry the Fowler in 928/29. Henry subdued the Slavic tribes up to the Oder river and his son Otto I established the marca Geronis on their territory, with the government first conferred to the Saxon count Gero.

The Northern March was split off in 965, however, large parts were again lost in the Great Slav Rising of 983, and the margravial title did not become hereditary until the time of Albert the Bear, another Saxon count from the noble House of Ascania, who established the Margraviate of Brandenburg in 1157. His son Margrave Otto I already achieved the dignity of an Arch-Chamberlain of the Holy Roman Empire in 1177. Emperor Charles IV by the Golden Bull of 1356 confirmed the electoral dignity of the Brandenburg margraves and in 1373 assigned the electorate to his son Wenceslaus in 1373. The Elector of Brandenburg held the seventh rank among the electors of the Empire and had five votes in the Council of Princes.

In 1415 Brandenburg was acquired by Burgrave Frederick of Nuremberg, the first member of the Swabian House of Hohenzollern to rule the margraviate. Over the centuries, the Hohenzollerns gradually rose to one of the most important dynasties of the Empire, rivalling with the ruling House of Habsburg, a process that intensified with the Protestant Reformation and the inheritance of the Polish Duchy of Prussia in 1618. The margraviate formed the core of the Brandenburg-Prussian state and the "Great Elector" Frederick William I made various accessions to the territory, the Treaty of Königsberg of 1656 marking a significant turn in its evolution. By the 1657 Treaty of Wehlau, Frederick William reached full sovereignty in his Prussian territories, which enabled his son Frederick I to assume the crown of a "King in Prussia" in 1701.

Establishment 
The margraviate remained a constituent part of Prussia, until after the Napoleonic Wars and the 1815 Congress of Vienna the kingdom's administration was divided into ten provinces. Most of the Margraviate's territory was incorporated into the new Province of Brandenburg, most notably the Mittelmark between the rivers Elbe and Oder and the Neumark region east of the Oder River. However, the Altmark on the western bank of the Elbe was incorporated into the Prussian Province of Saxony. The Province of Brandenburg also encompassed the territory of Lower Lusatia (where Cottbus had been a Brandenburgian exclave since the 15th century) as well as the area around Belzig and Jüterbog, all annexed from the Kingdom of Saxony for her alliance with Napoleon.

The Province headed by an Oberpräsident was subdivided into two governorates (Regierungsbezirke) named after their respective capitals, Potsdam in the northwest (Mittelmark, Prignitz and Uckermark) and Frankfurt (Oder) in the southeast (Neumark and Lower Lusatia). The provincial government was at first situated at the Potsdam royal residence. In 1827, it moved to Berlin, returned to Potsdam in 1843 and in 1918 finally settled in Charlottenburg. The Prussian capital Berlin originally formed part of the Province, but in the course of the Industrial Revolution from the 1830s onwards quickly developed to a metropolis, from 1871 as capital of the German Empire, and on 1 April 1881 was made an autonomous city district (Stadtkreis Berlin).

In contrast, the rural outer regions, though serfdom had been officially abolished by the 1807 Prussian reforms, was still characterised by large–scale land holding of the Junker nobility, similar to the eastern Prussian provinces of Silesia and Pomerania. The conditions in the countryside remained largely untouched, even during the Revolutions of 1848 that led to violent fights in the streets of Berlin. The large estates had to deal with low soil quality and—except for brown coal occurrences in Lower Lusatia—the lack of natural resources. The provincial life was perpetuated in the novels by Theodor Fontane and especially in his 1862–89 descriptive work Wanderungen durch die Mark Brandenburg.

Free State of Prussia 
In 1920, the Greater Berlin Act expanded the borders of Berlin, incorporating numerous surrounding districts and towns from Brandenburg to form Greater Berlin (Groß-Berlin) with a population of about 2,000,000, including the former town of Charlottenburg, the seat of Brandenburg's provincial government. The Great Depression helped the Nazi Party to establish itself as an important political power. After the Machtergreifung on 30 January 1933, the Nazi Gauleiter Wilhelm Kube held the office of the Oberpräsident, succeeded by Emil Stürtz in 1936. Due to its location in the vicinity of the German capital, Brandenburg was a centre of the Nazi terror regime, with concentration camps like Sachsenhausen and Ravensbrück and Nazi residences like Karinhall. In the late days of World War II it was the site of the bloody encounters of the Seelow Heights, at Halbe and finally the Battle of Berlin.

In 1945, after the war, the Neumark territory east of the Oder–Neisse line was ceded to the Republic of Poland to form the Zielona Gora Voivodeship (initially part of Poznan Voivodeship between 1945 and 1950, became Lubusz Voivodeship in 1998 after merging with Gorzów Voivodeship). The remaining territory became part of the Soviet occupation zone and was transformed into the state of Brandenburg, with Potsdam becoming state capital. In 1949, the state of Brandenburg became part of East Germany and, along with the other states of Eastern Germany, in 1952 was dissolved and divided into administrative districts. Brandenburg's territory roughly corresponded with the districts of Potsdam, Frankfurt/Oder and Cottbus. In 1990, following German reunification, Brandenburg was re-established as a state of the Federal Republic of Germany.

Administration 
The Prussian central government appointed for every province an Oberpräsident ("Upper President") carrying out central prerogatives on the provincial level and supervising the implementation of central policy on the lower levels of administration.

Since 1875, with the strengthening of self-rule within the provinces, the urban and rural districts (Kreise) elected representatives for the provincial Landtage diets. These parliaments legislated within the competences transferred to the provinces. The provincial diet of Brandenburg elected a provincial executive body (government), the provincial committee (Provinzialausschuss), and a head of province, the Landesdirektor ("Land Director").

Upper Presidents of Brandenburg 
 1815–1824: Georg Friedrich Christian von Heydebreck (1765–1828)
 1825–1840: Friedrich Magnus von Bassewitz (1773–1858)
 1840–1842: vacancy
 1842–1848: August Werner von Meding (1792–1871)
 1848–1849: Robert von Patow (1804–1890), per pro
 1849–1850: vacancy
 1849–1850: August Hermann Klemens Freiherr Wolff von Metternich (1803–1872), per pro
 1850–1858: Eduard Heinrich von Flottwell (1786–1865)
 1859–1862: Eduard Heinrich von Flottwell (1786–1865)
 1862: Werner Ludolph Erdmann von Selchow (1806–1884)
 1862–1879: Gustav Wilhelm von Jagow (1813–1879)
 1879–1899: Heinrich von Achenbach (1829–1899)
 1899–1905: Theobald von Bethmann Hollweg (1856–1921)
 1905–1909: August von Trott zu Solz (1855–1938)
 1909–1910: Friedrich Wilhelm von Loebell (1855–1931)
 1910–1914: Alfred von Conrad (1852–1914)
 1914–1917: Rudolf von der Schulenburg (1860–1930)
 1917–1919: Friedrich Wilhelm von Loebell (1855–1931)
 1919–1933: Adolf Maier (1871–1963), DDP
 1933–1936: Wilhelm Kube (1887–1943), NSDAP
 1937–1945: Emil Stürtz (1892–1945), NSDAP, since 1936 per pro

Land Directors of Brandenburg 
 1876–1896: Albert Erdmann Karl Gerhard von Levetzow (1827–1903), German Conservative Party
 1896–1912: Otto Karl Gottlob von Manteuffel (1844–1913), German Conservative Party
 1912–1930: Joachim von Winterfeldt-Menkin (1865–1945)
 1930–1933: Hugo Swart (1885–1952)
 1933–1944: Dietloff von Arnim (1876–1945), NSDAP

Subdivisions 

Between 1816 and 1822 there was a third governorate – the  – comprising the urban district of Berlin, the city of Charlottenburg and the municipalities of Gesundbrunnen, Lichtenberg, and Stralau. In 1822 the Berlin region merged into the Potsdam region.

Regierungsbezirk Berlin 
Established in 1816 this governorate, an enclave in the Potsdam region, merged into the latter in 1822.

Regierungsbezirk Frankfurt 
Urban districts (Stadtkreise)

 Cottbus (1886–1950, and from 1954; 1947–1952, and from 1990 part of Brandenburg state)
 Forst (Lusatia), (1897–1950; quarters west of the Oder merged in Cottbus district; from 1947 part of Brandenburg state)
 Frankfurt (Oder), (until 1827, 1877–1950, and from 1952; 1947–1952, and from 1990 part of Brandenburg state)
 Guben, (1884–1950; quarters west of the Oder merged in Cottbus district; from 1947 part of Brandenburg state)
 Landsberg (Warthe), (1892–1945)

Rural districts (Landkreise)

 Arnswalde, (1818–1945; from 1938 part of Pomerania province)
 Calau, (1818–1950; from 1947 part of Brandenburg state)
 Cottbus, (1818–1952; from 1947 part of Brandenburg state)
 Crossen (Oder), (1818–1945)
 Cüstrin, (until 1836; merged into Königsberg district)
 Friedeberg Nm. (i.e. in the New March; 1816–1945; from 1938 part of Pomerania province)
 Guben, (1818–1950; from 1947 part of Brandenburg state)
 Königsberg Nm. (i.e. in the New March; 1816–15 March 1946, remainder west of the Oder merged into Angermünde, Lebus and Oberbarnim districts)
 Landsberg (Warthe), (1818–1945)
 Lebus, (1816–1950; from 1947 part of Brandenburg state)
 Luckau, (1816–1952; from 1947 part of Brandenburg state)
 Lübben (Spreewald), (1816–1952; in 1835 Beeskow area ceded to Beeskow-Storkow; from 1947 part of Brandenburg state)
 Meseritz, (1818–1945; until 1938 part of Posen-West Prussia)
 Oststernberg, (1873–1945; partitioned from Sternberg district)
 Schwerin (Warthe) (1887–1945; until 1938 part of Posen-West Prussia)
 Soldin, (1818–1945)
 Sorau (Lusatia), (1816–1 April 1946, remainder west of the Oder merged into Cottbus, Forst and Spremberg districts)
 Spremberg (Lusatia), (1818–1993; 1947–1952, and from 1990 part of Brandenburg state)
 Sternberg, (1816–1873; partitioned into Ost- and Weststernberg)
 Weststernberg, (1873–1945; partitioned from Sternberg district)
 Züllichau-Schwiebus, (1818–1945)

Regierungsbezirk Potsdam 
Urban districts (Stadtkreise)

 Berlin, (1822–1881; on 1 April 1881 the city was disentangled from the Province of Brandenburg.)
 Brandenburg (Havel), (from 1881; from 1947 part of Brandenburg state)
 Charlottenburg, (1877–1920; merged in Greater Berlin)
 Eberswalde, (1911–1950; merged in Oberbarnim district; from 1947 part of Brandenburg state)
 Lichtenberg, (1908–1920; from 1912: known as Berlin-Lichtenberg; merged in Greater Berlin)
 Potsdam, (from 1809; 1947–1952, and from 1990 part of Brandenburg state)
 Rathenow, (1925–1950; merged in Westhavelland district; from 1947 part of Brandenburg state)
 Rixdorf, (1899–1920; from 1912: known as Berlin-Neukölln; merged in Greater Berlin)
 Schöneberg, (1899–1920; from 1912: known as Berlin-Schöneberg; merged in Greater Berlin)
 Spandau, (1886–1920; merged in Greater Berlin)
 Wilmersdorf, (1907–1920; from 1912: known as Berlin-Wilmersdorf; merged in Greater Berlin)
 Wittenberge, (1922–1950; merged in Westprignitz district; from 1947 part of Brandenburg state)

Rural districts (Landkreise)

 Angermünde, (1818–1952; from 1947 part of Brandenburg state)
 Beeskow-Storkow, (1836–1950; combined from partitioned parts of Teltow-Storkow and Lübben; from 1947 part of Brandenburg state)
 Jüterbog-Luckenwalde (renamed as Luckenwalde district in 1946; 1818–1952; from 1947 part of Brandenburg state)
 Niederbarnim (i.e. Lower Barnim; 1818–1952; widely merged in Greater Berlin in 1920; from 1947 remainder part of Brandenburg state)
 Oberbarnim (i.e. Upper Barnim; 1818–1952; from 1947 part of Brandenburg state)
 Osthavelland (i.e. Eastern Havelland; 1816–1952; widely merged in Greater Berlin in 1920; from 1947 remainder part of Brandenburg state)
 Ostprignitz (i.e. Eastern Prignitz; 1818–1952; from 1947 part of Brandenburg state)
 Prenzlau, (1818–1952; from 1947 part of Brandenburg state)
 Ruppin, (1818–1952; from 1947 part of Brandenburg state)
 Teltow, (1836–1952; partitioned from Teltow-Storkow; widely merged in Greater Berlin in 1920; from 1947 remainder part of Brandenburg state)
 Teltow-Storkow, (1816–1835; partitioned into Teltow and Storkow, which merged with northern Lübben to Beeskow-Storkow)
 Templin, (1818–1952; from 1947 part of Brandenburg state)
 Westhavelland (i.e. Western Havelland; 1816–1952; from 1947 part of Brandenburg state)
 Westprignitz (i.e. Western Prignitz; 1818–1952; from 1947 part of Brandenburg state)
 Zauch-Belzig, (1817–1952; from 1947 part of Brandenburg state)

References

External links 

 Further information 
 Population breakdown of Brandenburg province, 1910 

1816 establishments in Prussia
1946 disestablishments in Germany
Provinces of Prussia
States and territories disestablished in 1946